Keven Filipo Mealamu  (born 20 March 1979) is a former New Zealand rugby union footballer. He played at hooker for the Blues in Super Rugby, Auckland in the National Provincial Championship, and the New Zealand national team. He was a key member of 2011 and 2015 Rugby World Cup winning teams, becoming one of only 21 players who have won the Rugby World Cup on multiple occasions.

In a Bledisloe Cup test match against Australia on 20 October 2012, Mealamu became the third All Black to reach 100 test appearances. He clinched the 2003 Super Rugby Title.

Early life
The grandson of Samoan immigrants, Mealamu was raised in Tokoroa where his father, a body building champion, worked at the local timber mill. The family eventually moved to Auckland due to the decline of the timber industry. He is a former student of Aorere College, where his brother and former Manu Samoa player Luke Mealamu currently works as a social worker. As a schoolboy he played as a flanker for New Zealand Under-16s and New Zealand Schools before switching to hooker in 1998. After finishing school he worked as an apprentice signwriter in case his rugby career did not work out.

Career
Mealamu made his provincial debut for Auckland in 1999 against North Harbour. He first played for the Blues in 2000, but had a stint with the Chiefs in 2002 – the same year he debuted for the All Blacks. Mealamu also made a fine contribution to the start of the All Blacks' 2006 Tri Nations campaign with two tries against the Wallabies during the first match. Mealamu captained the Blues through their 2006 Super 14 campaign, but was forced to relinquish the captaincy in 2007 due to his commitments to the All Blacks. In 2014, he made his 150th appearance for the Blues, becoming the first player in Super Rugby history to make 150 appearances for one team.

International
Mealamu made his debut for the All Blacks on 23 November 2002, against Wales at Millennium Stadium in Cardiff. He was made test captain in the test match against Scotland during the All Blacks 2008 Grand Slam tour, as regular captain Richie McCaw was a reserve for that match. He was a part of New Zealand's 2011 Rugby World Cup winning squad.

Mealamu was known for his hard-tackling approach to the game

The 2015 Rugby World Cup Final on 31 October was his last match as an All Black. He was one of six senior players who retired from International rugby after the competition.

In the 2016 New Year Honours, Mealamu was appointed a Member of the New Zealand Order of Merit for services to rugby.

Leading of the haka
Mealamu became an important part of the leadership team of the national side and led the haka for the All Blacks 31 times. He led the Ka Mate version 23 times and the newer Kapa o Pango version 8 times. He first led the team in September 2007 against Italy. In his final international test he led the Kapa o Pango haka before the final against Australia during the 2015 Rugby World Cup.

Local politics

Mealamu was elected to the Papakura Local Board in 2019. In the 2022 Auckland local elections, Mealamu ran for the position of Franklin ward councillor, losing to Andy Baker.

Personal life
Mealamu is a skilled artist and has illustrated several books to raise money for the Starship Children's Hospital. A practising Catholic, Mealamu and his wife Latai, whom he married in 2003, have two children.

References

External links
Keven Mealamu | Rugby Database Profile
Blues profile

1979 births
New Zealand rugby union players
New Zealand sportspeople of Samoan descent
New Zealand international rugby union players
Auckland rugby union players
Chiefs (rugby union) players
Blues (Super Rugby) players
Rugby union hookers
Members of the New Zealand Order of Merit
Rugby union players from Tokoroa
Living people
People educated at Aorere College
New Zealand Roman Catholics